Happy Trails may refer to:
 Happy Trails (album), a 1968 album by Quicksilver Messenger Service
 "Happy Trails" (song), the theme song of The Roy Rogers Show

 Happy Trails (video game), a 1983 video game by Activision
 Happy Trails!, the eighth published collection of Bloom County cartoons, by Berke Breathed